Philip Fuemana (6 January 1964 – 28 February 2005) was a New Zealand musician. Affectionately known as "the Godfather of South Auckland", he was highly regarded for his work in South Auckland in establishing the Urban Pasifika sound.

Fuemana died of a heart attack at his Auckland home in 2005.

Fuemana 

Fuemana was a soul group consisting of Phil and siblings Tony, Christina and Pauly Fuemana as well as Matty J Ruys. Initially performing as Houseparty, the group released a single on Southside records, before moving to Deepgrooves and recording as Fuemana.

OMC 
The Otara Millionaire's Club was originally formed in 1993 by Phil Fuemana. Fuemana and his younger brother Pauly Fuemana recorded two tracks as the new band for producer Alan Jansson's Urban Pacifica collection, Proud.

Pauly suggested that they shorten the band's name to just the initials, and thereafter, he and Jansson were OMC. Pauly became the public face of the band and its primary performer, serving as the frontman and playing several instruments during performances and tours. However, the music was created by both of them, with Jansson co-writing all of the tracks and handling most of the arrangement and production duties in the studio. The OMC reached worldwide fame in 1995 with the single "How Bizarre", from the debut album of the same name.

Discography

Albums with Fuemana

Singles with Fuemana

References

External links
AudioCulture Phillip Fuemana at AudioCulture

1964 births
2005 deaths
New Zealand people of Niuean descent
New Zealand Māori musicians
20th-century New Zealand male singers
New Zealand singer-songwriters
People from Auckland
Taranaki (iwi)